Love War is a 45" record released by the Hardcore Punk band Death Piggy in 1983. It is known as Death Piggy's most popular record with the largest number of recognizable songs and fan favorites. It made Jello Biafra's list of best Punk rock albums for 1983.

Track list 
 G-O-D Spells GOD (0:47)
 Splatter Flick (0:59)
 Eat the People (1:01)
 Fat Man (1:15)
 Nympho (0:44)
 Bathtub in Space (1:26)
 No Prob Dude (0:58)
 Mangoes & Goats (1:18)

Copies 
This is also Death Piggy's rarest record, due to a misunderstanding with the recording engineer. His payment was never received, so the record was limited to 300 copies.

Personnel 
Dave Brockie : vocals/bass
Russ Bahorsky : guitar
Sean Summner : drums
Scott Krahl : backup vocals on track  7
Produced by Sean Summner and Don Zientara
Engineered by : Bruce Olsen and Don Zientara
Recorded at The Floodzone and Inner Ear Studios
Released on D.S.I Records

References 

1983 EPs
Death Piggy albums